The Southern 500, officially known as the Cook Out Southern 500 for sponsorship reasons, is a NASCAR Cup Series stock car race at Darlington Raceway in Darlington, South Carolina, United States. From 1950 to 2003, and again since 2015, the race has been held on Labor Day weekend. The Southern 500 is largely considered one of the Crown Jewels of the NASCAR calendar, and has been nicknamed NASCAR's "oldest superspeedway race." For decades, the race has been considered by competitors and media as one of the more difficult and challenging races on the NASCAR schedule, owing much to the track's unusual, asymmetrical egg-shape, rough pavement, and overall unforgiving nature. Darlington Raceway itself has a long and storied reputation as the "Track Too Tough to Tame."

The Southern 500 has a storied history, including Bill Elliott famously winning the Winston Million in 1985, and Jeff Gordon doing the same in 1997. It is also the site of Darrell Waltrip's final career victory (1992).

Through 2004, Darlington held two Cup series races annually, the Southern 500 in the fall, and a 400-mile event in the spring. In 2004, the Southern 500 was moved to November and was run as the second-to-last race in the inaugural Chase for the Championship. The following year, as the result of a settlement in the Ferko lawsuit, Darlington lost one of its two dates. The 500-mile race was moved to the Saturday of Mother's Day weekend in May and renamed for the sponsorship of Dodge. The race was held as a night race under-the-lights during this period.

The event re-assumed the Southern 500 name in 2009, and in 2015, moved back to its traditional Labor Day weekend date. From 2015 to 2020, the race weekend has been themed "NASCAR Throwback," with many cars fielding "Throwback" paint schemes (the revitalised spring race has taken that role in 2021). Since 2020, the event is currently scheduled to take place as the first race of the NASCAR playoffs.

The trophy features photos of all the past winners of the race.

History

1950–2003: Original run on Labor Day Weekend
The race began in 1950, as NASCAR's first 500-mile race, and it was the only race of such distance until the Daytona 500 debuted in 1959.  Through most of its history, the race was one of NASCAR's premier events, and was known as one of  four majors on the NASCAR circuit. From 1985–1997, it served as the fourth race of the popular Winston Million. Two drivers, Bill Elliott (1985) and Jeff Gordon (1997), clinched the Winston Million with victories in the Southern 500.

The Southern 500 was one of the last races on the circuit to embrace naming rights in its title. In 1989, the race added Heinz as a title sponsor, but kept the traditional "Southern" moniker in its official name. From 1992 to 2004, it was sponsored by PepsiCo products (Pepsi or Mountain Dew).

From 1950 to 2003, this annual event was traditionally held on Labor Day weekend (typically the first weekend of September). In the years before 1984, the race was held on Monday, Labor Day itself.

2004: November
For the 2004 season, a realignment of the NASCAR schedule saw the race move to November. Track management believed the November date would allow for cooler, more comfortable weather for fans, who had increasingly voiced concerns about the hot, humid, weather. Also, it meant the race would be part of the new Chase for the Championship. Rockingham lost its fall date to Fontana, and the Pop Secret 500 was moved to the prestigious Labor Day weekend date.

In 2004, Francis Ferko, a shareholder of the company that owned Texas Motor Speedway, sued NASCAR, saying they had violated antitrust laws by refusing to have a second race at Texas Motor Speedway, as many other tracks had. The case was settled in his favor, and NASCAR was forced to give up one of its Darlington dates so that a second race could be held at Texas.

2005–2013: Mother's Day weekend
Starting in 2005, Darlington was forced to contract down to one race per year. Officials replaced Darlington's two Cup Series events with one 500-mile race. The event's traditional moniker "Southern 500" was dropped for the time being. The race was situated on the Saturday of Mother's Day weekend in mid-May. Mother's Day weekend was a date that had been mostly avoided by NASCAR in recent decades. The Nashville 420 had used the Saturday of Mother's Day weekend for a time until it was discontinued in 1984. Moving the Darlington race to May loosely mimicked the period in which the spring race, once known as the Rebel 500, was held on or around Confederate Memorial Day.

Dodge, which had been sponsoring Darlington's spring race at that point, took over sponsorship of the 500-mile race in May. The title of the race was based on various Dodge models including the Charger, Challenger, and Avenger. The race would be held under-the-lights and proved to be well-attended.

Without a title sponsor after 2008, the race re-adopted the moniker of "Southern 500". Track officials and fans were anxious to revive the traditional name. GoDaddy was signed as presenting sponsor, and it became known as the Southern 500 presented by GoDaddy.com. The race was then sponsored by Showtime Networks from 2010 to 2011, and Bojangles' from 2012 to 2019.

While enjoying renewed success in attendance and popularity in May, there was still desire by some fans, media, and others to move the race back to its traditional Labor Day date. Especially after replacement races (Fontana and Atlanta) failed to gain any foothold on the desirable Labor Day weekend holiday slot. Bruton Smith, CEO of Speedway Motorsports even offered to buy the Darlington track to return it to Labor Day weekend and "get it back where it belongs".

2014: April
In 2014, the race switched dates with the spring Kansas race, and ran in the second weekend in April. This change, like the one ten years earlier, would only last a year. The 2014 race was still run at night, whereas the Kansas race on that date had been run during the afternoon.

2015–present: Return to Labor Day weekend
A revived interest in moving the Southern 500 back to Labor Day grew over the summer of 2014. In August 2014, it was announced that 2015 Southern 500 would return to its traditional Labor Day weekend slot, the first time since 2003. To combat the issue of heat and humidity that had resulted in the race originally being moved, the race is currently run Sunday night of Labor Day weekend, under the lights, with temperatures being cooler than they are during daytime hours.

To celebrate the return of the race to its traditional weekend, a concerted and highly publicized effort among NASCAR, the track, and teams were made to theme the weekend a "NASCAR Throwback." Thirty-two cars in the 43 car field ran throwback paint schemes during the event, with various other throwback aspects planned throughout the weekend. It was announced days before the race that legendary broadcasters Ken Squier, Ned Jarrett and Dale Jarrett would announce part of the race. Some hour into the broadcasting, Squier, and the Jarretts called the race lap-by-lap for about an hour. NBC, which also utilized its logos from the 1970s during the broadcast, was widely praised by many for bringing back old memories in the sport. The success of the event led to a nomination for Sports Event of the Year.

Due to the success and popularity in 2015, the "Throwback" theme for the weekend was run from 2015 to 2020.  In 2021, with the reinstatement of the second weekend during the 2020 season, the theme was moved to the spring meeting in order to allow playoff teams to focus on the playoff. The Labor Day weekend races (1950–2003) and the November race (2004), have been combined with the ten May/April races (2005–2014) and the Labor Day weekend races since 2015, to create a continuous lineage of the Southern 500 dating from 1950 to present.

Bojangles' ended its title sponsorship of the race after the 2019 race.

2020: New Format and Return to the NASCAR playoffs
When the 2020 NASCAR Cup Series schedule was released, the Southern 500 was scheduled as the only race at the circuit, again on Labor Day weekend.  It became the first race of the NASCAR playoffs' Round of 16 due to NASCAR ending the season a week earlier than usual, at Phoenix Raceway. The race was previously held in the playoffs when it began in 2004 as the ninth race.

Because of the global pandemic, Darlington Raceway returned to having two race weekends, as the Rebel 400 was reinstated in April as part of returning to the track following a nine-week pause.  A 500-kilometer Cup race was also scheduled that week as part of NASCAR's attempt to do a 36-race schedule, in effect creating three races over two weekends.

Cook Out, which had sponsored with Darlington Raceway as the official quick-service restaurant of the track, assumed naming rights for the Southern 500.    As a result of pandemic changes, the NASCAR Camping World Truck Series moved a race from Canadian Tire Motorsports Park (Mosport) to Darlington, making the Cook Out Southern 500 a doubleheader.

Starting in 2021, the throwback round theme was moved to the Rebel, again held on its original weekend as it was in 1957, but scheduled for Sunday.  The Truck Series again could not participate at Mosport, so the Southern 500 returned as a doubleheader with the Trucks in the afternoon and Cup in the evening.  Some teams are running throwbacks on this weekend, and not the spring weekend.

Selected race summaries
 1950: The very first running lasted over six hours and multiple cars blew tires.  Johnny Mantz drove a conservative race and emerged with the win.
 1960: In a race with 48 entries, numerous crashes occurred. Ankrum "Spook" Crawford was injured when a car crashed into the unprotected pit road area; later Bobby Johns crashed in the pits, killing three.  Richard Petty led 106 laps but spun out with 50 laps to go.  Pole-sitter Glenn Roberts broke an axle and finished ninth, 11 laps down.  Rex White was flagged the winner, but a reexamination of scoring showed White was credited with one extra lap he had not run, giving the win to Buck Baker.
 1965: Darel Dieringer broke with 39 laps to go after leading 199 laps, leaving Ned Jarrett alone by 14 laps en route to the win.  The race saw a scary melee when young Cale Yarborough crashed with Sam McQuagg in Turn One and Cale's car flew over the guardrail and landed outside the speedway; he was uninjured and interviewed for ABC Sports by Chris Economaki.
 1966: Darel Dieringer passed Richard Petty with seven laps to go and stormed to the win.  A scary crash erupted in Turn One as Earl Balmer smashed into the guardrail on Lap 186 and spun atop it, throwing debris into the open-air press box in the turn.
 1967: Richard Petty wins his only Southern 500
 1970: Buddy Baker joined his father Buck Baker in winning the Southern 500.  Five of the top six finishers drove either 1969 Dodge Daytonas or 1970 Plymouth Superbirds, making this the only Darlington race won by the famed winged Chryslers.
 1974: Cale Yarborough became a three-time Southern 500 winner, edging sophomore sensation Darrell Waltrip.   Crashes thinned the field and eliminated the likes of Richard Petty, Buddy Baker, David Pearson, and Bobby Allison; singled out for criticism was Richie Panch, involved in three wrecks during the day.   Allison accused Yarborough of wrecking him, a charge Yarborough angrily denied.
 1976: David Pearson ended a career slump in the Southern 500, taking his ninth win of his magic 1976 season, his first Southern 500 after six wins in the Rebel 500.  Richard Petty finished second, the 60th time in their careers Pearson and Petty had finished 1–2 in a Winston Cup Grand National race (the duo would finish 1–2 three more times in their careers with Pearson holding a 33–30 edge). Both Jimmy Carter and Bob Dole visited the race while on the campaign trail.
 1977: A huge fight between Cale Yarborough and Darrell Waltrip ended in a crash and Pearson grabbed his second straight Southern 500.  Following the race D.K. Ulrich, caught up in the fracas, asked Cale why he'd hit him; Cale replied "I didn't hit you, Jaws did;  Jaws Waltrip" – creating a popular nickname for Waltrip.
 1979: Pearson achieved vindication at the same track where earlier that year a pit accident cost him his ride with Wood Brothers Racing.   Driving Rod Osterlund's Chevrolet while regular driver Dale Earnhardt recovered from late-July injury, Pearson made up a lap when Darrell Waltrip spun out of the lead with 70 laps to go, then spun again some 20 laps later; he lost 12 laps and finished 11th after leading 165 laps.  Pearson edged young driver Bill Elliott for the win, his 104th career Winston Cup Grand National win.
 1980: Once again Waltrip and Pearson were keys to a shocking Southern 500; this time Waltrip, embroiled in a contract fight with DiGard Racing, led 196 laps from the pole while Pearson once again had to make up a lap, this time driving Hoss Ellington's Chevrolet.   But a timing chain broke on Waltrip, ending his race 39 laps from the finish.  Benny Parsons grabbed the lead while Pearson got back on the lead lap.  A late yellow for Cale Yarborough (who'd had a miserable day with a fuel fire and several earlier spins) set up a five-lap shootout between Parsons, Pearson, and Dale Earnhardt; Pearson took the lead on the restart, Earnhardt passed on Lap 364 but Pearson retook the lead on that same lap, but with two to go all three leaders crashed, in Turn, One on oil from a backmarker; Pearson limped to the line, but Terry Labonte caught and swung past at the white flag, grabbing his first career win.
 1982: The most competitive running of the Southern 500 took place as the lead changed 41 times among 17 drivers.   Bobby Allison in the #88 led 88 laps before breaking, while Darrell Waltrip in Junior Johnson's Buick led 23 laps before blowing his engine.  In all 14 cautions flew and helped set up a four-car shootout involving the cream of stock car racing's old guard (Cale Yarborough and Richard Petty) and the cream of its up-and-coming new guard (Dale Earnhardt and Bill Elliott).  Cale edged Petty, Earnhardt, and Elliott for his record fifth Southern 500, and what would be his last victory with M.C. Anderson's race team.
 1985: NASCAR's Winston Million program paid out when Bill Elliott took the win in the Southern 500, thus winning three of NASCAR's four biggest races (he'd won the Daytona 500 and Winston 500 earlier in the year).  Challenges by Dale Earnhardt and Cale Yarborough fell apart; Yarborough finished second despite breaking a power steering line. The million-dollar program made Elliott's winnings the highest in NASCAR history to that point.
 1986: Tim Richmond and Geoff Bodine swept the front row and combined to lead 330 laps. Intermittent rain pushed the four-hour contest to darkness.  Bodine ran dry and finished eighth while Bill Elliott's attempt to stretch his fuel came short with six to go and he finished third behind Richmond and Bobby Allison.  The win was the first at Darlington for crew chief Harry Hyde.  Dale Earnhardt hit Richard Petty six laps in and Petty was eliminated; "His mind goes out of gear," said an angered Petty.
 1987: Rain-shortened 1987 running after just 202 laps; the battle for the win turned into a showdown between Earnhardt and Richard Petty; Petty gunned past Earnhardt on a Lap 188 restart but Earnhardt retook the lead on lap 191 just before rain brought out what would be the race-ending yellow at Lap 198.  Rookie sensation Davey Allison won the pole and led 86 laps but crashed in Turn Four at Lap 164; the crash swept up Lake Speed while Mike Potter spun behind them and was drilled by Benny Parsons.
 1989: Darrell Waltrip had opportunity to win the Winston Million but crashed, leaving Dale Earnhardt to his second Southern 500 win.
 1990: Earnhardt, Bill Elliott, and Geoff Bodine timed together in the top three and combined to lead 286 laps between them; Bodine faded to eighth while Elliott finished fourth and Ernie Irvan led 70 laps and grabbed second, but no one could catch Earnhardt en route to his third Southern 500 in his previous four starts.  The race was famous for a vicious feud between Ken Schrader and Morgan Shepherd; Schrader crashed early in the race after an encounter with Shepherd, then after getting repairs he sped onto the track and rammed Shepherd in the third turn.   Shepherd finished 21st while Schrader was parked.
 1991: Harry Gant won the Southern 500 for the second time, leading 152 laps while pole-sitter Davey Allison led 151 laps but finished four laps down.  Gant's win began a four-race win streak, the first such in NASCAR since 1987.
 1992: Davey Allison entered the race with a chance for the Winston Million, but rain interfered, and cut the race short. Harry Gant and Davey Allison combined to lead 163 laps. With rain approaching the area, the leaders cycled through a series of pit stops around lap 292, but a scant handful of drivers stayed out. Allison's Crew chief Larry McReynolds sent a crew member to the NASCAR hauler to look at the weather radar. The crew member's misinterpretation of the radar led to Allison coming into the pits and changing four tires. Darrell Waltrip was among those who gambled and stayed out, inhered the lead just as the yellow came out for rain on lap 297. The skies opened up, and the race has ended after 298 laps. Davey Allison slid to 5th in the pit stop shuffle and was denied his chance at the million-dollar bonus. The victory would be Waltrip's 84th and final career win.
 1993: After an intense battle Mark Martin broke away from Dale Earnhardt and won the Southern 500, his fourth straight Winston Cup win.  He and Earnhardt combined to lead 279 laps.  Ernie Irvan finished fifth in his debut drive in Robert Yates after an acrimonious split from Morgan McClure Motorsports; Jeff Purvis finished 26th in the McClure Chevrolet.
 2003: In the last Southern 500 held on Labor Day weekend until 2015, Terry Labonte led the final 33 laps and held off Kevin Harvick for his last win in the Cup series. The race has been labeled by many as the most popular win of 2003 as everybody was always happy to see Labonte win.
 2011: Regan Smith stayed out on a late caution when the rest of the field pitted and sweated out a late crash involving Kevin Harvick and Kyle Busch to edge Carl Edwards for his first NASCAR win.  The win was overshadowed as Harvick and Busch collided on pit road when Harvick tried to throw a punch at Busch inside his cockpit; NASCAR fined the two drivers and put them on probation after the race.
 2012: Jimmie Johnson stayed out during the final round of pit stops on the advice of crew chief Chad Knaus. Johnson would later hold off Denny Hamlin and Tony Stewart to score team owner Rick Hendrick's 200th NASCAR Cup Series victory.
 2015: 2015 marked several changes. Most notably, the race was rescheduled to its traditional Labor Day date. As part of this return to tradition, the race was dubbed a 'throwback weekend', and the majority of teams entered into the race drove cars with retro paint jobs based on classic paint schemes used in the 1970s and 1980s. Also, retro-style ads were placed on the outside walls, and part of the race was called by former NASCAR broadcasters Ken Squier and father and son Ned and Dale Jarrett. The race also utilized a new experimental rules package that took away downforce from the car. The new package resulted in a very intense race, which saw a record-breaking 18 caution flags, leading to the average green flag run only being about 14.7 laps long. Carl Edwards rallied back from two laps down to overtake Brad Keselowski and take his second win of the year.

Past winners

Notes
 1969 and 1993: Race shortened due to rain/darkness.
 1987, 1992, 1999, and 2000: Race shortened due to rain.
 2005, 2011–12, and 2014: Race extended due to NASCAR overtime.
 2007: Race postponed from Saturday night to Sunday afternoon due to rain.
 2019: Race started on Sunday but finished Monday morning due to rain.

Track length notes
 1950–1952: 1.25 mile course
 1953–1969: 1.375 mile course
 Since 1970: 1.366 mile course

Multiple winners (drivers)

Multiple winners (teams)

Manufacturer wins

See also
 Darlington Record Club

References

External links
 

1950 establishments in South Carolina
NASCAR races at Darlington Raceway
Recurring sporting events established in 1950
NASCAR Cup Series races
Annual sporting events in the United States